David Ethan Graham (born November 10, 1981) is an American professional rock climber. Professing to enjoy bouldering the most, he is one of the elite sport climbers and boulderers of his generation. Graham repeats classic routes or boulder problems as well as performing cutting-edge first ascents. He is known for climbing, in 2005 an  boulder problem (The Story Of Two Worlds, Cresciano, Switzerland). He is also known for his stance against grade inflation and for his strong anti-chipping ethic. He writes an ongoing blog for the website of Climbing Magazine.

Biography 
Born in Maine, Graham was introduced to climbing in 1997 by one of his skiing teammates. Within a year, he climbed a  route, The Present. Quickly, he became one of the strongest climbers in the United States, before moving to Europe in 2005.

In 2005, he climbed an  boulder problem (The Story Of Two Worlds, Cresciano, Switzerland), and his first  route (Coup de Grace, Val Bavona, Switzerland).

Rock climbing 
 1 9a+\b
 4 9a+
 13 9a
 41 8c+
 66 8c
 82 8b+ (of which 3 onsighted)
 92 8b (of which 31 onsighted)
 91 8a+ (of which 61 onsighted)
 66 8a (of which 48 onsighted)

Redpointed routes 
:
Ali Hulk Sit Start Extension Total – Rodellar (SPA) – September 2020 – Fifth ascent. Originally considered 9b, but later downgraded to 9a+\b.

:
La Rambla – Siurana (SPA) – March 2019 
Thor's Hammer – Flatanger (NOR) – October 5, 2015 – Sixth ascent
Realization – Céüse (FRA) – July 30, 2007 – Fourth ascent
Coup de Grace – Val Bavona (SUI) – November 8, 2005 – First ascent

:
 Chocholoco – Carros (FRA)- October 14, 2009
 Abyss – Gorges du Loup (FRA) – October 3, 2009
 Kryptonite – Rifle (Colorado, USA) – September 14, 2008
 Bunda De Fora – Acephale (Canada) – September 6, 2007
 Ali-Hulk (de pie) – Rodellar (ESP) – June 27, 2007
 Esclatamasters – Perles (ESP) – March 8, 2007 – Second ascent. First ascent by Ramón Julián Puigblanqué
 A Muerte – Siurana (ESP) – December 7, 2006 – Third ascent 
 Bain de Sang – Saint-Loup (SUI) – April 13, 2005
 Psychedelic – Gorilla Cliffs (USA) – November 18, 2001 – First ascent
 Action directe – Frankenjura (GER) – May 21, 2001 – fourth ascent

Boulder problems 
 2 8C+
 17 8C
 69 8B+
 163 8B
 213 8A+ (of which 1 flashed and 2 onsighted)
 246 8A (of which 28 flashed and 2 onsighted)

8C+ (V16)
 Hypnotised Minds - Rocky Mountain National Park – October, 2019 – Third ascent. First ascent by Daniel Woods, 2010
 Euclase - Valle Bovona, Switzerland – April, 2022 – First Ascent. Awaiting grade confirmation.

:
La Rustica – Valle Bovona, Switzerland – April, 2022 – First Ascent Jimmy Webb 2019
4-low – Valle Bovona, Switzerland – February, 2022 – First Ascent Daniel Woods
Primitivo – Valle Bovona, Switzerland – February, 2022 – 3rd ascent, First Ascent Jimmy Webb 2019
Roadkill – Valle Bovona, Switzerland – December, 2021 – First Ascent Shawn Raboutou 
Trieste Assis – Red Rock, USA – April 2020
Squoze – Red Rock, USA – December 2019 – First Ascent Jimmy Webb
Meadowlark Lemon – Gateway Canyon (USA) – January 8, 2013 – Second ascent. First ascent by Paul Robinson in 2012
 The Wheel of Life – Hollow Mountain Cave (AUS) – June 8, 2012 – Sixth ascent. First ascent by Dai Koyamada in 2004. Composed of 65 moves, it links four different boulder problems. Although it is climbed without rope, it is considered to be almost a climbing route. It is commonly graded 8C as a boulder problem, and 9a as a route. Graham stated that it was "not possible to compare it to other boulder problems, due to its length", and that it was in a league above 9a routes he had climbed, possibly even a 9a+.
 Paint it Black – Rocky Mountain National Park (USA) – April 18, 2012 – Third ascent. First ascent by Daniel Woods in 2012
 The Ice Knife – Guanella Pass (USA) – October 18, 2011 – First ascent
 Warrior Up – Mt Evans / Wolverine Land (USA) – September 4, 2010 – Second ascent. First ascent by Daniel Woods
 Big Paw – Chironico (SUI) – November 27, 2008 – First ascent
 The Island – Fontainebleau (FRA)- April 7, 2008 – First ascent
 From Dirt Grows The Flowers – Chironico (SUI) – March 7, 2005 – First ascent
 The Story Of Two Worlds – Cresciano (SUI) – January 9, 2005 – First ascent
Foundation's Edge - Fionnay (SUI) – October 15, 2013 – First Ascent

See also 
Notable first free ascents

References

External links 
 

 Profile on 27 Crags
 Profile on ClimbAndMore.com
 Dave Graham's Pro Blog on Climbing.com
 Old interview at Planet Mountain

1981 births
Living people
American rock climbers
Boulder climbers